Gartness railway station served the hamlet of Gartness, Stirling, Scotland, from 1856 to 1934 on the Forth and Clyde Junction Railway.

History 
The station was opened on 26 May 1856 by the Forth and Clyde Junction Railway. To the east end was a siding and to the west was a level crossing. The station closed to passengers on 1 October 1934 and closed to goods on 1 November 1950.

References 

Disused railway stations in Stirlingshire
Railway stations in Great Britain opened in 1856
Railway stations in Great Britain closed in 1934
1856 establishments in Scotland
1950 disestablishments in Scotland